The Kwere also known as Ngh'wele (Wakwere in Swahili) are a matrilineal ethnic and linguistic group native to Bagamoyo District and Chalinze District in Pwani Region of coastal Tanzania. The primary language spoken is Ngh'wele, called Kikwere in Swahili. The most famous person of Kwere descent is former President of Tanzania Jakaya Kikwete.

History
In 1987, the Kwere population was estimated to number 98,000. The government of Tanzania released data for the 2012 census, but it was not  by ethnic group and such detail may not be published in the near future. In the country's 1967 population census, 48,132 people on the mainland identified themselves as belonging to the Ngh’wele ethnic group. The overwhelming majority of them lived in their traditional residential areas in Bagamoyo district (35,404 people), with another 3,857 people living in neighboring Kisarawe district. In addition, small groups of Ngh’wele people were said to be residents of the Morogoro Region (3,764) and Dar es Salaam (2,902). Reliable census data since 1967 are not available, as subsequent government demographic collections no longer record ethnicity.

The total population of the Pwani Region for 2012 was 1,098,668. In the past, the overwhelming majority of the Kwere lived in their traditional residential areas in  Bagamoyo district on the coast.

Culture
The pervasive dominance of the Swahili language in coastal affairs throughout East Africa for many centuries have led to most peoples indigenous in the area to be at least bilingual, the Ngh'were are no different. This was confirmed in 2002 by Bagamoyo elders who attended a conference held in the city championing its nomination as a UNESCO World Heritage site. In 2011, Bagamoyo was reported as the recipient of Tanzania’s seventh world heritage site. What impact this award will have on Ngh'were residency in the city is not yet known, but the tour handlers are advertising globally.

References

Ethnic groups in Tanzania
Indigenous peoples of East Africa